Orthotylus eleagni is a species of bug from the Miridae family that is endemic to Ukraine.

References

Insects described in 1881
Endemic fauna of Ukraine
Hemiptera of Europe
eleagni